Vertus Wellborn Hardiman (March 9, 1922 – June 1, 2007) was a victim of a US government human radiation experiment at the age of five that left him with a painful skull deformity that forced him to cover his head for 80 years.

Life 
Hardiman was born in Lyles Station, Indiana. In 1928, he attended Lyles Consolidated School where he and nine other children were severely irradiated during a medical experiment conducted at the local county hospital. To get parental consent the experiment was misrepresented as a new therapy for the scalp fungus known as ringworm. The radiation of the skull led to immediate symptoms but also to a severe progressive necrosis of the bone throughout his life.

The school children from Lyles Station School were delivered by their schoolbus, including Hardiman who was only five years old at the time and not technically enrolled in school.  His mother sent him with his older brother to receive what they had been told was treatment for ringworm.  All of the children treated with the radiation complained of the same symptoms:  they all experienced headaches, suffered from dizziness, and felt extreme burning of the scalp.  Eventually all the children lost their hair permanently.

The parents of the children met with a local lawyer and filed a lawsuit against the hospital, focusing on how the parents had been misled and tricked, but the hospital were found not liable. Many suffered long-term effects, but Hardiman's were the most pronounced.

In 1945 Hardiman traveled to California in search of broader opportunity. In 1946 he worked for the County of Los Angeles General Hospital, where he served with distinction. He lived his last years in Altadena, California and died at age 85.

Hardiman's life is the subject of a documentary released in 2011 that was written and produced by Wilbert Smith and directed by Brett Leonard.

References

1922 births
2007 deaths
People from Gibson County, Indiana